Dorchester may refer to:

Geography

England
Dorchester, Dorset, the county town of Dorset
 Dorchester (UK Parliament constituency), a former parliamentary constituency in Dorset
HM Prison Dorchester, a men's prison located in Dorchester in Dorset, England closed in December 2013
Dorchester on Thames, Oxfordshire, a village
The Dorchester, a luxury hotel in London

Canada
Dorchester, New Brunswick, shire town of Westmorland County
Dorchester Parish, New Brunswick
Dorchester, Ontario, a rural community in Middlesex County
Dorchester (electoral district), a current federal electoral district in Quebec
Dorchester (provincial electoral district), a former Quebec provincial electoral district
Dorchester Boulevard, former name of part of René Lévesque Boulevard in Montreal
Dorchester Penitentiary, a medium-security federal prison

United States
Dorchester, Illinois
Dorchester, Iowa
Dorchester, Boston, Massachusetts
 Dorchester Avenue (Boston)
Dorchester Pottery Works, an historic site in Massachusetts
Dorchester, Nebraska  
Dorchester, New Hampshire
Dorchester, South Carolina
Dorchester, Texas
Dorchester, Wise County, Virginia
Dorchester, Wisconsin
Dorchester County, Maryland
Dorchester County, South Carolina

Military
 USS Dorchester, the name of several United States Navy ships
 SS Dorchester, a War Shipping Administration troop transport ship torpedoed February 3, 1943, noted for four Army Chaplains that gave up their life vests to save others
 A fictional 'HMS Dorchester featured in the Norman Wisdom film The Bulldog Breed
 "Dorchester", a nickname for the AEC Armoured Command Vehicle
 Dorchester armour, a variant of Chobham armour used on modern battle tanks

People
 Troy Dorchester (born 1970) Canadian chuckwagon racer

Alternate name
 The Duke of Dorchester a.k.a. Pete Doherty (born 1945), professional wrestler
 Guy Carleton, 1st Baron Dorchester, a military commander in the Seven Years' War and American Revolutionary War, later Commander-in-Chief, North America, Governor of Quebec, and Governor General of Canada
 Dudley Carleton, 1st Viscount Dorchester (1573–1632), English diplomat

Titles
 Marquess of Dorchester
 Countess of Dorchester
 Earl of Dorchester
 Viscount Dorchester
 Baron Dorchester

Religion
Historic bishops of Dorchester:
For the bishops in Wessex, see Bishop of Winchester
For the bishops in Mercia, see Bishop of Lincoln
Bishop of Dorchester, modern episcopal title
Dorchester Abbey, in Dorchester, Oxfordshire
Dorchester Friary, in Dorset, England

Other
 3858 Dorchester, an asteroid
 Dorchester Publishing, a book publisher in the United States
 Dorchester Town F.C., an association football club from Dorchester, Dorset
 Dennis Dorchester, a motorcoach autobus made by Dennis

See also